The men's 100 metre freestyle was a swimming event held as part of the swimming at the 1928 Summer Olympics programme. It was the seventh appearance of the event, which had not been featured only at the 1900 Games. The competition was held on Friday and Saturday, 10 and 11 August 1928. Thirty swimmers from 17 nations competed. Nations had been limited to three swimmers each since the 1924 Games. Johnny Weissmuller of the United States repeated as gold medalist in the event, the second man to do so (after Duke Kahanamoku, who Weissmuller had beaten in 1924 for his first gold). It was the fifth consecutive victory for an American swimmer in the men's 100 metre freestyle. István Bárány earned Hungary's first medal in the event since 1908 with his silver. Katsuo Takaishi's bronze was Japan's first men's 100 metre freestyle medal. Bárány and Takaishi prevented the Americans from sweeping the medals a third consecutive time (1920 and 1924), as the United States swimmers finished first, fourth, and fifth.

Background

This was the seventh appearance of the men's 100 metre freestyle. The event has been held at every Summer Olympics except 1900 (when the shortest freestyle was the 200 metres), though the 1904 version was measured in yards rather than metres.

Two of the five finalists from 1924 returned: gold medalist Johnny Weissmuller of the United States and fifth-place finisher Katsuo Takaishi of Japan. Weissmuller, as in 1924, was a heavy favorite in the event. He held the world record and had not been beaten in seven years.

Chile, Panama, and Poland each made their debut in the event. The United States made its seventh appearance, having competed at each edition of the event to date.

Competition format

This freestyle swimming competition used a three-round (quarterfinals, semifinals, final) format. The advancement rule was the one used since 1912; for each round before the final, the top two in each heat plus the fastest third-place swimmer would advance. There were 7 heats of between 3 and 5 swimmers, allowing 15 swimmers to advance to the semifinals. The 3 semifinals had 5 swimmers each; 7 advanced to the final.

Each race involved two lengths of the 50-metre pool.

Records

These were the standing world and Olympic records (in seconds) prior to the 1928 Summer Olympics.

Johnny Weissmuller improved his own Olympic record in the semifinals with 58.6 seconds and equalized this time again in the final.

Schedule

Results

Heats

The fastest two in each heat and the fastest third-placed from across the heats advanced.

Heat 1

Heat 2

Heat 3

Heat 4

Heat 5

Heat 6

Heat 7

Semifinals

The fastest two in each semi-final and the fastest third-placed from across the semi-finals advanced.

Semifinal 1

Semifinal 2

Semifinal 3

Final

Saturday 11 August 1928:

Results summary

References

External links
Olympic Report
 

Swimming at the 1928 Summer Olympics
Men's events at the 1928 Summer Olympics